Joseph Walter Dziedzic (born December 18, 1971 in Minneapolis, Minnesota) is a retired American professional ice hockey left winger.

Career
Joe Dziedzic was drafted in 1990 while playing for Edison High School in Minneapolis and was named Minnesota Mr. Hockey the same year. Following high school, Dziedzic continued playing at the University of Minnesota for four seasons. He spent his first pro seasons split between the NHL and AHL, but was forced into early retirement due to an eye injury.

Personal
Dziedzic currently runs a youth hockey program in Minneapolis and is the Minneapolis High School hockey coach.

Joe's father, Walt Dziedzic, was a Minneapolis police officer, served the City Council for 22 years, and was a Park Board Commissioner for another 12 years, before announcing plans to retire at the end of 2009.  His sister, Kari Dziedzic, has served as Chair of the Minneapolis Charter Commission and was elected to the Minnesota Senate in a January 2012 special election.

Career statistics

References

External links

Joe Dziedzic Hockey Camps
Pens Player Info Page
Star Tribune Article

1971 births
Living people
American men's ice hockey left wingers
Cleveland Lumberjacks players
Minnesota Golden Gophers men's ice hockey players
Phoenix Coyotes players
Pittsburgh Penguins draft picks
Pittsburgh Penguins players
Springfield Falcons players
Ice hockey people from Minneapolis
Edison High School (Minnesota) alumni